The 2013 Open de Suède Vårgårda will be the 8th road race running on the Open de Suède Vårgårda.

General standings (top 10)

Source

Points standings

Individuals
World Cup individual standings after 7 of 8 races.

Source

Teams
World Cup Team standings after 7 of 8 races.

Source

References

External links

2013 in women's road cycling
2013 in Swedish sport
2013 UCI Women's Road World Cup
Open de Suède Vårgårda